Aiginiakos Football Club is a Greek professional football club based in Aiginio, Pieria, Greece. It plays its home matches at the Municipal Stadium "Giannis Paralikidis".

History
Aiginiakos is a club of Aiginio, a town of the prefecture of Pieria. The colors of Aeginian are blue-white. Initially, the club came from the merger of two groups of Aiginio, Ethnikos and Digenis, in 1953. The headquarters of Aiginiakos are the municipal stadium "Giannis Paralikidis".

In the 1975–76 season, Aiginiakos came very close to the Beta Ethniki (second division), since in the special championship among the first teams from four prefectures he reached the source, but water did not drink as in the crucial match at Aiginio with Niki Polygyrou defeated 0–2 at the same time he lost the ticket for the Beta Ethniki. In the 1977–78 season, Aiginiakos took the 4th place in the championship of the Delta Ethniki. In the year 1986–87 he rose to Delta Ethniki, prevailing at the barracks of the Ghost Petrosa. In the period 1987–88 he managed to stay in the Delta Ethniki by winning Achilleas Triandrias in Polykastro in a barrage match. The next season after an excellent presence rises to the Gamma Ethniki (1989), passing the threshold of professional football, the greatest distinction in the history of the club. Notable is the presence of the team in the championship of Delta Ethniki, where it had a total of 13 years.

Aiginiakos appeared in Gamma Ethniki's Northern Group in 1989–90, but finished the season in the last place and relegated to the regional championship.

In 2012, Aiginiakos lifted the Pieria FCA Cup in 2012 after beating AE Peristasi 1–0 in the final and were supposed to play in the 2012–13 Delta Ethniki after having ended first in the A' Division of the local Pieria championships. However, they took the place of fellow Pieria-based club Platamon Academy in the Football League 2 – the latter were Group 3 champions in the 2011–12 Delta Ethniki but could not obtain a professional licence to play in the 2012–13 Football League 2. They merged with Platamón FC and got the licence needed. In the Football League 2 things were easy for the teams, as they knew that the top five teams would be promoted to Football League. Aiginiakos got the 4th place with ease, and were promoted to Football League for the first time in their history.

Honours

Domestic
Since 1996

Leagues
 Gamma Ethniki 
 Winners (1): 2015–16
 Pieria Football Clubs Association Championship 
 Winners (4): 1995–96, 1998–99, 2001–02, 2011–12

Records

Most club appearances

Affiliated clubs 
  PAOK

References

External links
Official website 

Football clubs in Central Macedonia
1972 establishments in Greece
Football clubs in Pieria